Walt Stickel (1922-1987) was a professional American football player who played offensive lineman for six seasons for the Philadelphia Eagles and Chicago Bears.

References

1922 births
American football offensive linemen
Philadelphia Eagles players
Chicago Bears players
Tulsa Golden Hurricane football players
1987 deaths
Penn Quakers football players